Salamanca District is one of eight districts of the province Condesuyos in Peru.

Geography 
Some of the highest mountains of the district are listed below:

References